Chief ministers in Sri Lanka are elected heads of the provincial boards of ministers, bodies which aid and advice the governors, the heads of the provincial government, in the exercise of their executive power. The governor appoints as chief minister a member of the provincial council who, in his opinion, commands the support of a majority of that council. There are nine chief ministerial positions in the country, out of which only six are currently occupied, while 3 are vacant and under the governor's direct rule.

Appointment
Governor may appoint a chief minister, who would be the leader of the political party that commands the majority of the provincial council.

Duties
The duties of the chief minister includes;
 Advising the governor on the appointment of the boards of ministers. 
 Informing the governor of the province of all decisions of the Board of Ministers relating to the administration of the affairs of the province and the proposals for legislation.
 Furnish information relating to the administration of the affairs and legislation of the province to the governor.

Salary
As per the Provincial Councils (Payment of Salaries and Allowances) Act, No. 37 of 1988, the chief minister is entitled to monthly salary and allowances equal of the governor, less than fifty rupees. In addition, since all chief ministers are members of provincial council they are entitled to allowances and benefits of provincial councilor.

Incumbent chief ministers

Notes

References

External links
 Sri Lanka Provinces from 1988